Sanjabi Rural District is a rural district (dehestan) in Kuzaran District, Kermanshah County, Kermanshah Province, Iran. At the 2006 census, its population was 9,575, in 2,037 families. The rural district has 74 villages.

References 

Rural Districts of Kermanshah Province
Kermanshah County